Marc Gicquel was the defending champion, but he chose not to compete this year.Richard Gasquet win in the final 4–6, 6–1, 6–4, against Michaël Llodra.

Seeds

Draw

Finals

Top half

Bottom half

External Links
Main Draw
Qualifying Singles

BNP Paribas Primrose Bordeaux - Singles
2010 Singles